The Kapitza–Dirac effect is a quantum mechanical effect consisting of the diffraction of matter by a standing wave of light. 
The effect was first predicted as the diffraction of electrons from a standing wave of light by Paul Dirac and Pyotr Kapitsa (or Peter Kapitza) in 1933. The effect relies on the wave–particle duality of matter as stated by the de Broglie hypothesis in 1924.

Explanation

In 1924, French physicist Louis de Broglie postulated that matter exhibits a wave-like nature given by:

where λ is the particle wavelength, h is the Planck constant, and p is the particle momentum.
From this, it follows that interference effects between particles of matter will occur. This forms the basis of the Kapitza–Dirac effect.
Specifically, Kapitza–Dirac scattering operates in the Raman–Nath regime. This is to say that the interaction time of the particle with the light field is sufficiently short in duration such that the motion of the particles with respect to the light field can be neglected. Mathematically, this means the kinetic energy term of the interaction Hamiltonian can be neglected. This approximation holds if the interaction time is less than the inverse of the recoil frequency of the particle, . This is analogous to the thin lens approximation in optics.
A coherent beam of particles incident on a standing wave of electromagnetic radiation (typically light) will be diffracted according to the equation:

where n is an integer, λ is the de Broglie wavelength of the incident particles, d is the spacing of the grating and θ is the angle of incidence. This matter wave diffraction is analogous to optical diffraction of light through a diffraction grating.
Another incidence of this effect is the diffraction of ultra-cold (and therefore almost stationary) atoms by an optical lattice that is pulsed on for a very short duration. The application of an optical lattice transfers momentum from the photons creating the optical lattice onto the atoms. This momentum transfer is a two-photon process meaning that the atoms acquire momentum in multiples of 2ħk, where k is the wavevector of the electromagnetic. The recoil frequency of the atom as can be expressed by:

where m is the mass of the particle. The recoil energy is given by

Mathematics

The following is based on the mathematical description by Gupta et al.
The AC Stark shift of the standing wave potential can be expressed as

where  is the single-photon Rabi frequency and the detuning of the light field  ( is particle resonance).
The particle wavefunction immediately after interaction with the light field is given by

where  and the integral is over the duration of the interaction. Using the identity for Bessel functions of the first kind, the above wavefunction becomes

 

It can now be seen that  momentum states are populated with a probability of  where  and the pulse area (duration and amplitude of the interaction) .
The transverse RMS momentum of the diffracted particles is therefore linearly proportional to the pulse area:

Realisation

The invention of the laser in 1960 allowed the production of coherent light and therefore the ability to construct the standing waves of light that are required to observe the effect experimentally. 
Kapitsa–Dirac scattering of sodium atoms by a near resonant standing wave laser field was experimentally demonstrated in 1985 by the group of D. E. Pritchard at the Massachusetts Institute of Technology. A supersonic atomic beam with sub-recoil transverse momentum was passed through a near resonant standing wave and diffraction up to 10ħk was observed. 
The scattering of electrons by an intense optical standing wave was experimentally realised by the group of M. Bashkansky at AT&T Bell Laboratories, New Jersey, in 1988.

References 

Diffraction
Quantum mechanics
Paul Dirac